The maximum distortion criterion (also von Mises yield criterion) states that yielding of a ductile material begins when the second invariant of deviatoric stress  reaches a critical value. It is a part of plasticity theory that mostly applies to ductile materials, such as some metals. Prior to yield, material response can be assumed to be of a nonlinear elastic, viscoelastic, or linear elastic behavior.

In materials science and engineering  von Mises yield criterion is also formulated in terms of the von Mises stress or equivalent tensile stress, . This is a scalar value of stress that can be computed from the Cauchy stress tensor. In this case, a material is said to start yielding when the von Mises stress reaches a value known as yield strength, . The von Mises stress is used to predict yielding of materials under complex loading from the results of uniaxial tensile tests. The von Mises stress satisfies the property where two stress states with equal distortion energy have an equal von Mises stress.

Because the von Mises yield criterion is independent of the first stress invariant, it is applicable for the analysis of plastic deformation for ductile materials such as metals, as onset of yield for these materials does not depend on the hydrostatic component of the stress tensor.

Although it has been believed it was formulated by James Clerk Maxwell in 1865, Maxwell only described the general conditions in a letter to William Thomson (Lord Kelvin). Richard Edler von Mises rigorously formulated it in 1913. Tytus Maksymilian Huber (1904), in a paper written in Polish, anticipated to some extent this criterion by properly relying on the distortion strain energy, not on the total strain energy as his predecessors. Heinrich Hencky formulated the same criterion as von Mises independently in 1924. For the above reasons this criterion is also referred to as the "Maxwell–Huber–Hencky–von Mises theory".

Mathematical formulation

Mathematically the von Mises yield criterion is expressed as:

Here  is yield stress of the material in pure shear. As shown later in this article, at the onset of yielding, the magnitude of the shear yield stress in pure shear is √3 times lower than the tensile yield stress in the case of simple tension. Thus, we have:

where  is tensile yield strength of the material.  If we set the von Mises stress equal to the yield strength and combine the above equations, the von Mises yield criterion is written as:

or

Substituting  with the Cauchy stress tensor components, we get
,

where  is called deviatoric stress. This implies that the yield condition is independent of hydrostatic stresses.

Reduced von Mises equation for different stress conditions

Uniaxial (1D) stress
In the case of uniaxial stress or simple tension, the von Mises criterion simply reduces to
,

which means the material starts to yield when  reaches the yield strength of the material , in agreement with the definition of tensile (or compressive) yield strength.

Multi-axial (2D or 3D) stress
An equivalent tensile stress or equivalent von-Mises stress,  is used to predict yielding of materials under multiaxial loading conditions using results from simple uniaxial tensile tests. Thus, we define

where  are components of stress deviator tensor :

.

In this case, yielding occurs when the equivalent stress, reaches the yield strength of the material in simple tension, . As an example, the stress state of a steel beam in compression differs from the stress state of a steel axle under torsion, even if both specimens are of the same material. In view of the stress tensor, which fully describes the stress state, this difference manifests in six degrees of freedom, because the stress tensor has six independent components. Therefore, it is difficult to tell which of the two specimens is closer to the yield point or has even reached it. However, by means of the von Mises yield criterion, which depends solely on the value of the scalar von Mises stress, i.e., one degree of freedom, this comparison is straightforward: A larger von Mises value implies that the material is closer to the yield point.

In the case of pure shear stress, while all other , von Mises criterion becomes:

.

This means that, at the onset of yielding, the magnitude of the shear stress in pure shear is  times lower than the yield stress in the case of simple tension. The von Mises yield criterion for pure shear stress, expressed in principal stresses, is

This equation represents an ellipse in the plane .

Summary

Physical interpretation of the von Mises yield criterion
Hencky (1924) offered a physical interpretation of von Mises criterion suggesting that yielding begins when the elastic energy of distortion reaches a critical value. For this reason, the von Mises criterion is also known as the maximum distortion strain energy criterion.

 with the elastic shear modulus .

In 1937  Arpad L. Nadai suggested that yielding begins when the octahedral shear stress reaches a critical value, i.e. the octahedral shear stress of the material at yield in simple tension.

 

thus we have

 
 Strain energy density consists of two components - volumetric or dialational and distortional. Volumetric component is responsible for change in volume without any change in shape. Distortional component is responsible for shear deformation or change in shape.

Practical engineering usage of the von Mises yield criterion

As shown in the equations above (which equations?), the use of the von Mises criterion as a yield criterion is only exactly applicable when the following material properties are homogeneous and have a ratio of:

Since no material will have this ratio precisely, in practice it is necessary to use engineering judgement to decide what failure theory is appropriate for a given material. Alternately, for use of the Tresca theory, the same ratio is defined as 1/2.

The yield margin of safety is written as

Although the given criterion is based on a yield phenomenon, extensive testing has shown that use of a "von Mises" stress is applicable at ultimate loading

See also

 Yield surface
 Huber's equation
 Henri Tresca
 Stephen Timoshenko
 Mohr–Coulomb theory
 Hoek–Brown failure criterion
 Yield (engineering)
 Stress
 Strain
 3-D elasticity

References 

Materials science
Plasticity (physics)
Yield criteria
Structural analysis